Eggbergen is a hamlet in the canton of Uri in Switzerland.

Tourism 
Due to its location in the Swiss Alps, at height of 1000m, the area is a popular tourist destination. The area features numerous trails above Lake Lucerne and Altdorf.

References 

 

Geography of the canton of Uri